The 2022 Los Angeles County elections were held on November 8, 2022, in Los Angeles County, California, with nonpartisan blanket primary elections for certain offices being held on June 7. Two of the five seats of the Board of Supervisors were up for election, as well as two of the countywide elected officials, the Sheriff and the Assessor. In addition, elections were held for the Superior Court, along with two ballot measures.

Municipal elections in California are officially nonpartisan; candidates' party affiliations do not appear on the ballot.

Board of Supervisors 

Two of the five seats of the Los Angeles County Board of Supervisors were up for election to four-year terms. Incumbent supervisors Hilda Solis handily won re-election in the primary. In the third district, incumbent Sheila Kuehl Supervisor Sheila Kuehl opted not to run for a third term and had instead chosen to retire. State senator Robert Hertzberg West Hollywood City Councilor Lindsey Horvath advanced to the general election, eliminating state senator Henry Stern, Roxanne Beckford, Craig A. Brill and Jeffi Girgenti. Horvath narrowly defeated Hertzberg in the general election.

Sheriff 

Incumbent Sheriff Alex Villanueva ran for re-election to a second four-year term. He was first elected in 2018, defeating incumbent Jim McDonnell with 52.8% of the vote. Villanueva has been a controversial figure since then, including his refusal to enforce vaccine mandates during the COVID-19 pandemic in California, as well as investigations regarding unconstitutional policing, obstruction of evidence, and the persistence of deputy gangs. However, he is also credited with reforms in the department, including the implementation of body cameras and the removal of ICE agents from county jails.

Candidates

Advanced to runoff 
Robert Luna, former Long Beach Police Chief
Alex Villanueva, incumbent sheriff

Declared 
Cecil Rhambo, Los Angeles Airport Police Chief
Matt Rodriguez, retired Santa Paula Police Chief
April Saucedo Hood, Long Beach Unified School District police officer
Britta Steinbrenner, retired LASD captain
Eric Strong, LASD lieutenant
Eli Vera, LASD division chief
Karla Yesenia Carranza

Did not file 
Enrique Del Real

Declined 
Art Acevedo, former Chief of the Houston, Austin, and Miami Police Departments

Endorsements

Polling

Results

Assessor 

Incumbent Assessor Jeffrey Prang ran for re-election to a third four-year term. He was re-elected in 2018 with 60.3% of the vote.

Candidates

Declared 
Mike Campbell, deputy assessor
Anthony Lopez, deputy assessor
Jeffrey Prang, incumbent assessor
Sandy Sun, deputy assessor

Endorsements

Results

Superior Court 
Nine elections will be held for judges to the Los Angeles County Superior Court on June 7. Runoff elections are scheduled to be held on November 8 if no candidate receives a majority of the vote. Judges are elected to six-year terms.

Office 3

Candidates 
Frank Amador, attorney
Sherilyn Peace Garnett, incumbent judge
Tim Reuben, attorney

Endorsements

Results

Office 60

Candidates 
Abby Baron, Deputy Los Angeles County District Attorney
Sharon Ransom, Deputy Los Angeles County District Attorney
Mark Rosenfeld, attorney
Troy Slaten, administrative law judge at the California Department of Industrial Relations
Anna Slotky, Deputy Los Angeles County Public Defender

Endorsements

Results

Office 67

Candidates 
Ryan Dibble, Deputy Los Angeles County District Attorney
Elizabeth Lashley-Haynes, Deputy Los Angeles County Public Defender
Fernanda Maria Barreto, Deputy Los Angeles County District Attorney

Endorsements

Results

Office 70

Candidates 
Randy Fudge, Long Beach Assistant City Prosecutor
Holly L. Hancock, Deputy Los Angeles County Public Defender
Eric Alfonso Torices, attorney and adjunct professor
Matthew Vodnoy, attorney
Renee Yolande Chang, Deputy Los Angeles County District Attorney

Endorsements

Results

Office 90

Candidates 
Leslie Gutierrez, Deputy Los Angeles County District Attorney
Naser Khoury, attorney
Melissa Lyons, Deputy Los Angeles County District Attorney
Kevin Thomas McGurk, Deputy Los Angeles County Public Defender

Endorsements

Results

Office 116

Candidates 
David Gelfound, incumbent judge
Lloyd Handler, Deputy Los Angeles County Public Defender

Endorsements

Results

Office 118

Candidates 
Melissa Hammond, Deputy Los Angeles County District Attorney
Georgia Huerta, Deputy Los Angeles County District Attorney
Keith Koyano, Deputy Los Angeles County District Attorney
Klint McKay, supervising ALJ for the California Department of Social Services
Carolyn Park, attorney
Shawn Thever, Deputy Los Angeles County Counsel

Endorsements

Results

Office 151

Candidates 
Thomas D. Allison, attorney and professor
Karen A. Brako, Deputy Los Angeles County District Attorney
Patrick Hare, Deputy Los Angeles County Public Defender
Richard Quiñones, Deputy Los Angeles County District Attorney

Endorsements

Results

Office 156

Candidates 
Carol Elswick, incumbent judge
Albert Robles, former Mayor of Carson

Endorsements

Results

Ballot measures 
The following referendums appeared on the general election ballot:
 Measure A
 Providing Authority to Remove an Elected Sheriff for Cause. This charter amendment would allow the Board of Supervisors to remove an elected Sheriff from office by a four-fifths vote for reasons including "violation of law related to a Sheriff's duties, flagrant or repeated neglect of duties, misappropriation of funds, willful falsification of documents, or obstructing an investigation." The amendment is supported by a majority of the Board of Supervisors and the Los Angeles Times, and is opposed by Sheriff Alex Villanueva.

 Measure C
 Cannabis Business Tax Measure. This measure would enact an annual tax on cannabis businesses located in unincorporated areas of the county.

See also 
 Government of Los Angeles County
 2022 California elections

Notes

References 

Los Angeles County
Los Angeles County